is an area located in Fukuoka Prefecture, Japan. Its name is made up of the kanji for 'big', 'field', and 'castle'. It is mostly a southern suburb of the city of Fukuoka, and has a border to the northwest with the Hakata-ku area of the city. It also shares borders with Dazaifu and Kasuga, Umi, Chikushino, Nakagawa and Shime. The border with Umi is marked by the summit of Otoganayama at 268 metres above sea level, a wide expanse of deciduous and bamboo forest, uninhabited except by the occasional snake. The  flows through Ōnojō on its way to Hakata bay, with some of its tributaries such as  originating in the mountains in the south. Ducks, turtles, koi, egrets, herons and Japanese wagtails can be seen in or around the river, depending on the season.

As of September 30, 2016, the city has an estimated population of 99,965 and a population density of 3,717.55 persons per km2. The total area is 26.89 km2.

The city was founded on April 1, 1972.  The city flower is the Chinese bellflower, known in Japanese as kikyō.

JR Kyushu has a railway station named Ōnojō, five stops south of Hakata Station on the Kagoshima Main Line. JR Mizuki Station is on the south-eastern edge of Onojo. The Nishitetsu Tenjin Ōmuta Line also has two stations within Onojo. There are also Nishitetsu buses and local municipal buses.

There is a Daimonji festival in September, near the Madokapia culture centre, library and city office. It has areas devoted to the mizu shobai. It also has many Shinto shrines and Buddhist temples.

At the beginning of the 21st century the area has seen continued real estate development partly due to good infrastructure, unlike more rural parts of the prefecture. The retailers Seiyu Group and Aeon have stores in the area, as do several conbini chains. However, in summer 2009 very heavy rain led to a mudslide, killing two people on the Kyushu Expressway.

Musician Aska is from Ōnojō, as is  baseball player Yuichi Honda.

The city has a comprehensive recycling policy, but deforestation was continuing in 2011. Central Onojo is on the flight path to Fukuoka airport, so noise pollution can be a problem.

It is part of the fifth congressional district of Fukuoka Prefecture.

The city has created several walking routes.

Attractions

The Ōnojō Cocoro-no-furusato-kan City Museum (大野城心のふるさと館) opened on July 21, 2018. Exhibiting materials relating to the city's natural history, archaeology, and history, it is successor of the Ōnojō Museum of History (大野城市歴史資料展示室), which opened in 1990.
In Kamiori there is an aviary with an extensive collection of owl themed art.

References

External links

 Ōnojō City official website 

 
Cities in Fukuoka Prefecture